NPS-2143 (SB-262,470A) is a calcilytic drug which acts as an antagonist at the Calcium-sensing receptor (CaSR), and consequently stimulates release of parathyroid hormone. Calcilytic drugs have been researched as potential treatments for osteoporosis, and as the first such compound developed, NPS-2143 is still widely used in research into the CaSR receptor as well as design of newer calcilytic agents.

See also 
 Cinacalcet

References 

Calcilytics
Amines
Chloroarenes
Nitriles